Circ or CIRC may refer to:

 Čirč, a village and municipality in northern Slovakia
 Circ (company), a German scooter-sharing company acquired by Bird
 Circ (duo), an American music duo
 China Insurance Regulatory Commission
 Climate Impacts Research Centre
 Compact Infra Red Camera, an instrument on the satellite ALOS-2
 Cross-interleaved Reed-Solomon coding, used for error detection and error correction on compact discs
 Walkman Circ, a MP3 player

See also
 Circulation (disambiguation)
 Cirque (disambiguation)
 SERC (disambiguation)
 Circa (disambiguation)